Duludao class dispatch boat is a class of little known naval auxiliary ship currently in service with the People's Liberation Army Navy (PLAN). The exact type still remains unknown, but it has received the NATO reporting name Duludao class. Of approximately more than a dozen units commissioned, many of them have been decommissioned since mid 2010s.

Ships of this class in PLAN service are designated by a combination of two Chinese characters followed by s two-digit number. The second Chinese character is Jiao (交), short for Jiao-Tong-Ting (交通艇), meaning dispatch boat (ferry) in Chinese, because these ships are classified as dispatch boats. The first Chinese character denotes which fleet the ship is service with, with East (Dong, 东) for East Sea Fleet, North (Bei, 北) for North Sea Fleet, and South (Nan, 南) for South Sea Fleet. However, the pennant numbers are subject to change due to changes of Chinese naval ships naming convention, or when units are transferred to different fleets.

References

Auxiliary ships of the People's Liberation Army Navy